Kurak (also Romanized as Kūrak) is a village in Mishan Rural District, Mahvarmilani District, Mamasani County, Fars Province, Iran. At the 2006 census, its population was 13, in 4 families.

References 

Populated places in Mamasani County